The Gila Institute for Technology (GIFT) is a joint technological education district serving eastern Arizona.

Member high schools
 Duncan High School
 Fort Thomas High School
 Mount Graham High School
 Morenci Junior/Senior High School
 Pima High School
 Safford High School
 Thatcher High School

References

External links
Official website

School districts in Arizona